The Archdiocese of Guwahati is a Latin Church ecclesiastical territory or archdiocese of the Catholic Church located in the city of Guwahati in India. The archdiocese is a metropolitan see with six suffragan dioceses in its ecclesiastical province.

History
 30 March 1992: Established as Diocese of Guwahati from the Metropolitan Archdiocese of Shillong–Gauhati, Diocese of Tezpur and Diocese of Tura
 10 July 1995: Promoted as Metropolitan Archdiocese of Guwahati

Leadership
 Archbishops of Guwahati
 Archbishop John Moolachira (18 January 2012–present)
 Archbishop Thomas Menamparampil, S.D.B. (10 July 1995 – 18 January 2012)
 Bishops of Guwahati (Latin Rite) 
 Bishop Thomas Menamparampil, S.D.B. (later Archbishop) (30 March 1992 – 10 July 1995)

Suffragan dioceses
 Bongaigaon 
 Dibrugarh
 Diphu
 Itanagar
 Miao
 Tezpur

Sources
 GCatholic.org
 Catholic Hierarchy

Roman Catholic dioceses in India
Christian organizations established in 1992
Roman Catholic dioceses and prelatures established in the 20th century
1992 establishments in Assam
Christianity in Assam
Guwahati